Le petit gnome was a German educational television series produced by SWR Fernsehen, teaching French as a foreign or second language to young German viewers aged 6 to 12 years.

See also
List of German television series

German educational television series
German children's television series
French-language education television programming